Antonio González Izquierdo (born 13 October 1969) is a former field hockey goalkeeper from Spain, who won the silver medal with the men's national team at the 1996 Summer Olympics in Atlanta, Georgia. He also participated in the 1992 Summer Olympics in Barcelona.

References
 Spanish Olympic Committee

External links
 

1969 births
Living people
Field hockey players from Cantabria
Spanish male field hockey players
Olympic field hockey players of Spain
Field hockey players at the 1992 Summer Olympics
Field hockey players at the 1996 Summer Olympics
Olympic medalists in field hockey
Medalists at the 1996 Summer Olympics
Olympic silver medalists for Spain